Thomas Nelson Hastings (May 23, 1858 – May 15, 1907) was an American politician and architect who served as the President of the New Hampshire Senate.

On January 4, 1899 Hastings was chosen as the President of the New Hampshire Senate.

Hastings died at the Parker House Hotel in Boston on May 15, 1907.

Notes

 

1858 births
1907 deaths
19th-century American architects
Republican Party New Hampshire state senators
Presidents of the New Hampshire Senate
Massachusetts Institute of Technology alumni
19th-century American politicians